Qual é o Seu Talento? 1 was the first season of Brazilian reality talent show Qual é o Seu Talento?. The season premiered on August 5, 2009 and concluded on December 16, 2009.

Former MTV Brasil VJ André Vasco was the show's host and the judging panel consisted of Thomas Roth, Arnaldo Saccomani, Carlos Eduardo Miranda and Cyz Zamorano (the same four from the first two seasons of Ídolos Brazil).

Dance group D-Efeitos coming out as the winners, Magician Renner was the runner-up and singer Edu Porto came in third place.

Preliminary auditions

Auditions were held in the following cities:

Semifinals

There were five semifinals, each with nine contestants. Judges voted with the same criterion: contestants who took one or more red votes would be automatically eliminated, while contestants who took all green votes would return at the end of the episode for the judges to decide who would go to the final.

Key

Part 1

Part 2

Part 3

Part 4

Part 5

Wild Card

Eleven contestants who took all green votes on the semifinals but failed to make it to the final were invited back to the show. In the end, lyrical singer Márcio Sena was chosen by the judges as the sixth and final member of the final six.

Final

The final took place on December 16, 2009 and was a 90-minute special. Each judge had to buzzed out one out of the six remaining acts until only the final two remaining. Dance group D-Efeitos coming out as the winners, while magician Renner was the runner-up.

Finalists

Elimination Chart

Notable contestants
D-Efeitos
Magician Renner
Márcio Sena

References

External links
 Qual é o Seu Talento? Official website
 

2009 Brazilian television seasons
Season 01
2009 Brazilian television series debuts

pt:Qual é o Seu Talento?